Róbert Lifkai (also known as Lifka, born July 20, 1916, date of death unknown) was a Hungarian field hockey player who competed in the 1936 Summer Olympics.

In 1936 he was a member of the Hungarian team which was eliminated in the group stage of the Olympic tournament. He played one match as back.

External links
 
Róbert Lifkai's profile at Sports Reference.com
Róbert Lifkai's profile at the Hungarian Olympic Committee 

1916 births
Year of death missing
Hungarian male field hockey players
Olympic field hockey players of Hungary
Field hockey players at the 1936 Summer Olympics